The Haval H9 is a full-size SUV produced by Haval, a sub-brand of Great Wall Motor debuted on the 2014 Beijing Auto Show and commenced production in November 2014.

Overview
The Haval H9 is the largest vehicle ever developed by Great Wall Motors with the drive train being a new all-wheel drive system, and is the second brand new SUV with a body-on-frame chassis developed by Haval, following the Haval H3 and Haval H5. It competes with the likes of the Toyota Land Cruiser Prado and Mitsubishi Pajero. The H9 is available in both 5-seater and 7-seater configurations.

Construction is a body-on-frame chassis underpinned with double-wishbone front suspension, and a multi-link solid axle at the rear. A ZF 8-speed automatic transmission was also added to improve fuel efficiency and performance.

An All-Terrain four-wheel-drive control system is available and modulates engine response between various modes including Auto, Snow, Sand, Mud and 4 Low.

The H9 was given a facelift for 2019 onwards consisting of a new front end as well as the rear spare tyre moved from the rear door to the bottom of the car.

Australian market
The Haval H9 SUV was upgraded for the 2018 model year in the fourth quarter of 2017. The exterior features new grilles, fog lights and new alloy wheels, while the interior feature a new instrument panel with digital speedometer.

Acceleration time from  has decreased from 13.4 to 10.6 seconds. For the safety features of the 2018 model year Haval H9, Lane departure warning and blind spot monitoring are standard features, while the top of the trim LUX model comes with an additional panoramic sunroof. In terms of off-road performance, Haval Australia has also been working with Australian suspension company Ironman 4X4 to develop an exclusive Australian suspension tune for the Australian market Haval H9s. The results are heavier springs, upgraded shock absorber valving, and toe-in minor changes. All 2018 H9 models feature a new anti-lock brake system module with re-calibrated electronic stability control.

Haval’s Australian dealer network is 15 nationwide as of 2017, growing from four dealers at the brand’s Australian launch in 2015. A further 10 dealers are expected to join the fold by the beginning of 2018 and Haval is aiming to have a total of 50 dealers in Australia by 2020. Haval sells its vehicles in more than 30 regions internationally including Australia, Russia, Ecuador, Chile, Malaysia, South Africa, Saudi Arabia and UAE. As a result, Haval’s annual global crossover and SUV sales have grown from 281,000 to 938,000 from 2012 to 2017.

In 2015, ANCAP rated the car with 4 stars out of five. In this rating the car has some safety features: intelligent seat belt reminder (driver, front passenger and 2nd row seats), frontal and side, head protection Airbag, Antilock braking system (ABS), electronic brakeforce distribution (EBD), electronic stability control (ESC), emergency brake assist (EBA), fatigue detection (Attention assist), daytime running lights (DRL), Hill launch assist, reversing collision avoidance, roll stability system and tyre pressure monitoring system (TPMS).

References

External links
Official website

Haval vehicles
Cars introduced in 2014
2020s cars
Full-size sport utility vehicles
All-wheel-drive vehicles